Sainte-Félicité is a municipality in L'Islet Regional County Municipality in the Chaudière-Appalaches region of Quebec.  Its population in the Canada 2021 Census was 350.

See also
L'Islet Regional County Municipality
Gobeil River, a river
Big Black River (Saint John River), a river
List of municipalities in Quebec

References

Municipalities in Quebec
Incorporated places in Chaudière-Appalaches